Hofstade is a village in the municipality of Zemst, Flemish Brabant, Belgium.

History 
Hofstade was part of the municipality of Muizen, until it became an independent community in 1870. It remainend independent until it became a part of Zemst in 1977. The church was only built in the late 20th century.

Populated places in Flemish Brabant